The Cyropaedia, sometimes spelled Cyropedia, is a partly fictional biography of Cyrus the Great, the founder of Persia's Achaemenid Empire. It was written around 370 BC by Xenophon, the Athenian-born soldier, historian, and student of Socrates. The Latinized title Cyropaedia derives from the Greek Kúrou paideía, meaning "The Education of Cyrus". Aspects of it would become a model for medieval writers of the genre mirrors for princes. In turn, the Cyropaedia strongly influenced the most well-known but atypical of these, Machiavelli's The Prince, which fostered the rejection of medieval political thinking and development of modern politics.

Format

In substance, the Cyropaedia is a narrative describing the education of the ideal ruler. It has been interpreted as an early novel, a biography, and a manifesto on leadership. The work is intended to communicate political and moral instruction to its audience, most of whom would have been Athenian elites.

While most scholars note that Xenophon did not write it as a historical text, the Cyropaedia does not fit into any known classical genre, only somewhat resembling an early novel. Its validity as a source of Achaemenid history has been repeatedly questioned, and numerous descriptions of events or persons have been found inaccurate.

Despite its limitations, it has been argued that the Cyropaedia provides a glimpse of Cyrus the Great's character. It gives an artistic portrayal of Cyrus, which, according to some, could not have been so positive without a historical memory of good leadership. Xenophon (c. 431 – 355 BC) was not a contemporary of Cyrus (c. 580 – 530 BC) and it is likely that some of his information about Persia was based on events that occurred at the later Achaemenid court. Xenophon had visited such as one of the "Ten Thousand" Greek soldiers who fought on the losing side of a Persian civil war, which he recounted in his Anabasis.

Content

Book One
The first book's opening states that it began as a reflection about why some rulers are willingly obeyed and others are not. Everywhere, the author observes, humans fail to obey their rulers; the one exception is Cyrus the Great, a man who inspired obedience.

A list of Cyrus's conquests follows, and the author seeks to understand why his subjects obeyed him "willingly." The work narrates his entire life, with only the first of eight books concerning the actual education of Cyrus.

The first book is devoted to Cyrus's descent, education, and stay at the court of his maternal grandfather, the Median dynast Astyages. Scholars have noted that Xenophon's description of pre-imperial Persian education is unusual and appears to be based upon the traditions of Sparta: the subject of Xenophon's other work the Constitution of the Lacedaemonians.

Books Two to Seven
Books two to seven cover Cyrus's life as a Median vassal on his path to establishing the world's largest empire. In these books, Cyrus is upheld as an example of classical virtue, but also uses what are now known as Machiavellian tactics. He proves a faithful vassal to the Medes, initially acting as a general to defend them from the more powerful and assertive Babylonian empire. He does so by cultivating alliances with nations such as the Chaldeans, Hyrcanians, Cadusians, Saka, and Susians. The remaining allies of Babylon include many nations of Asia Minor, as well as a corps of Egyptian infantry. Croesus of Lydia acts as general in the two powers' final field battle. Cyrus then returns with an increasingly international army to conquer Babylon. He is able to avoid a long siege by deflecting the course of the river through it, then sending soldiers in over the dry bed during a festival night. The claim that Babylon was conquered on the night of a festival by diverting the Euphrates River from its channel is also made by Herodotus (1.191).

Book Eight 
Book eight is a sketch of Cyrus' kingship and his views of monarchy.

The last section of this book (8.8) also describes the rapid collapse of Cyrus's empire after he died. It has been speculated that this section was written by a later author. Alternatively, it may symbolize Xenophon's theoretical inconsistency concerning his conception of an ideal ruler, or show that Xenophon did not mean to describe an ideal ruler in any simple way. It may also intend to display, rather than undermine, Cyrus's strength as a leader.

Related characters of questionable historical truth appear in the narrative as well. For example, the romance of Abradatas and Pantheia forms much of the narrative's latter half (v.1.3, vi.1.31ff, vi.4.2ff, vii.3.2ff).

Reception
In classical antiquity, the Cyropaedia was considered the masterpiece of a widely respected and studied author. Polybius, Cicero, Tacitus, Dionysius of Halicarnassus, Quintilian, Aulus Gellius and Longinus thought highly of Xenophon and his work. Classical authors believed that he composed the Cyropaedia in response to the Republic of Plato or vice versa, and Plato's Laws seems to allude to the Cyropaedia. Among classical leaders, Scipio Aemilianus is said to have carried a copy with him at all times; it was also a favorite of Alexander the Great and Julius Caesar.

Legacy 
The Cyropaedia was rediscovered in Western Europe during the late medieval period as a piece on political virtue and social organization. It heavily influenced the late medieval and Renaissance genre known as mirrors of princes, which gave examples of leadership behavior to educate future rulers. Giovanni Pontano, Bartolomeo Sacchi, Leon Battista Alberti and Baldassare Castiglione treated Cyrus as such an example. However, unlike most mirrors of princes, whether the Cyropaedia was really intended to describe an ideal ruler is a subject of debate.

The Cyropaedia continued to be widely read in the early modern period and during the Enlightenment. Machiavelli's The Prince, which represented a turn toward modern political thinking, was particularly influenced by the Cyropaedia and represents a more sophisticated reading of Xenophon. It appears critical of his idealistic approach to Cyrus, while also considering Cyrus's deceit and the danger of deceitful leaders part of the Cyropaedia's message. Many early modern writers after Machiavelli, including Montaigne, Montesquieu, Rousseau, Bacon, Jonathan Swift, Bolingbroke, Shaftesbury, Edward Gibbon, and Benjamin Franklin also esteemed Xenophon as a philosopher and historian. The Cyropaedia was often used to model correct prose in classical Attic Greek, mastery of which was part of the education of European and American gentlemen in the eighteenth century. Thomas Jefferson had two copies of the book in his library, possibly for this reason.

In the nineteenth century, Xenophon and the Cyropaedia began to decline in popularity compared to other classical authors and works. This is partly because its endorsement of monarchy had grown less favorable. Yet, in the late twentieth and early twenty-first centuries, Xenophon's work has become more studied and esteemed. Some present scholars argue that the basic historical events of the Cyropaedia are more credible than those described in Herodotus’s Histories, and debate continues over the work's relevance and historical accuracy.

References

Sources

 
 
 
  [Project Gutenberg]
  [Perseus/Tufts University]
Sage, Paula Winsor. "Dying in Style: Xenophon's Ideal Leader and the End of the Cyropaedia" The Classical Journal 90.2 (1994): 161-74

External links

 translation By Henry Graham Dakyns
 
 Manuscript at Somni.
 

Works by Xenophon
Cultural depictions of Cyrus the Great
Political philosophy in ancient Greece
Biographies about politicians
Books about military personnel